Maud Durbin (November 9, 1871 – December 25, 1936) was an American actress. She was the wife of actor Otis Skinner and the mother of actress and author Cornelia Otis Skinner.

Durbin was born in Moberly, Missouri, on November 9, 1871. A protégé of Helena Modjeska, she was touring in the Booth-Modjeska Dramatic Company when she met actor Otis Skinner, who went on to form his own dramatic company, which included Durbin, and they married in 1895. Maud Durbin was also a writer, and was the author of Pietro, as well as the published short stories The Ne'er to Return Road and Tom's Little Star.

Durbin died in New York City on December 25, 1936. She was buried at River Street Cemetery in Woodstock, Vermont, where she and her husband had a summer home.

References

External links

1871 births
1936 deaths
19th-century American actresses
American stage actresses
20th-century American actresses
American women writers
People from Moberly, Missouri
Burials in Vermont